John George Rankin (14 February 1914 – 8 December 1989) was a New Zealand rugby union player. A flanker, Rankin represented  and, briefly,  at a provincial level. He was a member of the New Zealand national side, the All Blacks, in 1936 and 1937. He played four matches for the All Blacks including three internationals.

During World War II, Rankin served as an officer with the New Zealand forces, being commissioned as a second lieutenant in September 1941. He was a Canterbury selector–coach from 1948 to 1954, and a South Island selector between 1955 and 1957.

References

1914 births
1989 deaths
New Zealand rugby union players
New Zealand international rugby union players
New Zealand military personnel of World War II
New Zealand rugby union coaches
Rugby union players from Christchurch
People educated at Christchurch Boys' High School
Canterbury rugby union players
Wellington rugby union players
Rugby union flankers
New Zealand referees and umpires